Nephi Hannemann (February 6, 1945 – March 31, 2018) was an actor and singer of Samoan, German and English descent who appeared numerous times on Hawaii Five-O and One West Waikiki.

Biography
Nephi Hannemann was born in American Samoa to Gustav Hannemann and Faiaso Soliai Hannemann. His brother is Mufi Hannemann, the 12th Mayor of City and County of Honolulu.

Hannemann was one of seven children, four boys and three girls. His mother was the daughter of notable Samoan chiefs, with a type of royal heritage. He had German heritage on the side of his father, Gustav.

Hannemann  was a member of the Church of Jesus Christ of Latter-day Saints.

He graduated from Farrington High School in 1962, and was a football player at Ricks College in Idaho and at the University of Hawaii at Manoa.

Hannemann died on March 31, 2018 in Los Angeles.

Entertainer
Besides acting, Hannemann was an accomplished singer and recording artist. He would provide entertainment at Democratic Party rallies, such as those attended by Governor George Ariyoshi and Hawaii State Senator Francis A. Wong.

At one time, he was said to have rivalled singer Don Ho in versatility.

Hannemann was working on a second album with Lani Kai but unfortunately, Lani died before its completion. He has an appearance on the LP album Invitation to Paradise ~ Polynesian Cultural Center, released by BMC in 1979.

He had a recurring role as Nephi in One West Waikiki, and has had various roles in films.

Other
As well as writing scripts and screen plays for a number of years, Hannemann helped establish a business and travel magazine in 1983 called the Maui Quarterly. For seven years, he served as its main writer and advertising director. As of 2002, he was the spokesman for Hawaiian and Polynesian-made healthcare products.

Discography

Filmography

References

External links

American male television actors
Musicians from Hawaii
Living people
American people of Samoan descent
Actors of Samoan descent
Latter Day Saints from Hawaii
1945 births